Fluke is a novel by British novelist James Herbert. First published in 1977, it concerns a dog named Fluke.

Plot 
The novel starts with the birth of Fluke, a dog who soon realizes that he used to be a man, the book follows Fluke's efforts to find out what happened to him and why he is a dog. Soon he starts to remember bits of his previous life and remembers he had a wife and daughter. The story follows Fluke's journey to reunite with his family. Along the way, he makes friends with a red dog named Rumbo. Rumbo is killed when a car in a scrap yard the dogs live in falls on him. Fluke appears in numerous Herbert novels. Rumbo started life as a human, like Fluke. Towards the end of Fluke Rumbo comes back as a Red Squirrel, he later appears in the James Herbert Novels The Magic Cottage and Once.

Adaptations in other media 
Fluke was adapted into a film in 1995, starring Samuel L. Jackson and Matthew Modine.

References

1977 British novels
Novels by James Herbert
Novels about dogs
British novels adapted into films
New English Library books